The 1974 Michigan gubernatorial election was held on November 5, 1974. William Milliken was elected to his second term as Governor of Michigan in a rematch with Sander Levin.

Primary elections
The primary elections occurred on August 6, 1974.

Democratic primary

Republican primary

General election

Candidates
Major party candidates
William G. Milliken, Republican
Sander M. Levin, Democratic

Major party running mates
James Damman, Republican
Paul Brown, Democratic

Other candidates
Zolton Ferency, Human Rights
Hugh McDermand Davidson, American Independent
Eldon K. Andrews, Conservative
Robin Maisel, Socialist Workers
James Horvath, Socialist Labor
Thomas Dennis, Communist
Peter Signorelli, U.S. Labor

Other running mates
Regina McNulty, Human Rights
Josephine A. Chapman, American Independent
Al G. Terwilliger, Conservative
Ruth C. Getts, Socialist Workers
Alfred W. Wegener, Socialist Labor
William Allan, Communist
Ronald Wayne Evans, U.S. Labor

Results

References

1974
Michigan
Gubernatorial
November 1974 events in the United States